TV Time (formerly TVShow Time) is a tracking platform and social television network for TV and movies, available in app and desktop forms. Using TheTVDB as a data source, it allows users to store information about their media consumption and leave reviews.

History

Features 

Every registered TV Time user has their own profile. When a user opens the app, four tabs appear at the bottom of the screen: Shows, Movies, Discover and Profile.

Shows 

 Watch List: A list of show posters or thumbnails with episode descriptions (depending on a user's preference). Here, users can see what shows to watch next, what they haven't seen in a while, and their watch history based on which shows they've added to their Watch List. In the poster view, a yellow progress bar that illustrates the user's progression on a show. This tab also allows one to mark an episode as ‘watched.’ In the thumbnail view, users have the option to  swipe right or press the check mark next to the episode description. In the poster view, users click the check mark within the episode pages.
 Show Pages: Once an episode is marked as watched, individual episode pages reveal comments from the TV Time community and gives the ability to rate the episode, express feelings, and vote for favorite characters. There is a no spoiler rule in place, so unless a user has marked the episode as watched, this content will remain hidden.
 Upcoming: The ‘Upcoming’ section works as a reminder for future episodes of shows a user has followed. Users can also opt in to receive push notifications an hour before a show airs.

Movies 

 Watch List: Similar to the Shows tab, a list of movie posters appears. Here, users can movies they have added to their Watch List. This tab also allows one to mark an episode as ‘watched’ by going into the movie and selecting the check mark next to the movie description.
 Movie Pages: Movie pages allow users to rate the film, express feelings, and vote for favorite characters. The “no spoiler rule” applies here as well if a user has not marked the movie as ‘watched,’ they won't see comments left by the TV Time community.
 Upcoming: The ‘Upcoming’ list features movies a user has added to their Watch List that have yet to be released.

Discover 

The app offers an explore feature which allows users to discover new shows according to different criterion, such as genre and popularity.

 Search & Discover More: The search bar lets users find shows, movies, and other users within TV Time. If a user isn't sure what to watch next, they have the option of using the ‘Discover More’ feature. This section has genre filtering capabilities, show status options (ongoing or ended), and trending series (what's popular or the “most binged”).
 Recommendations: The ‘Top Shows for You’ field displays programming that a user may want to add to their Watch List based on genres and shows that they enjoy.
 Trending: ‘Trending Shows & Movies’ features what's currently popular in TV Time based on the number of user comments within the last 3 days while ‘Recent Activity’ displays series that a users’ in-app friends are following.

Profile 

 Stats: The top of a user's profile features certain stats, such as how much time the user has spent watching TV a.k.a. their “TV Time.” This clock shows an estimated amount of time a user has spent watching television. The accumulated time is based on the episodes marked as watched and their duration. This is also available for movies in the “Movie Time” section. The top also features a number of episodes and movies watched by a user, which is based on the number of episodes a user has marked as watched. Another ‘Stats’ option at the bottom of the profile allows a user to dig deeper with graphs, badges, and rankings.
 Show & Movie Lists: A user's profile displays recent shows/films that they've tracked. A profile may also show off lists of favorite shows/films if the user has chosen to do so. Users also have the option to get creative with “custom lists” that can combine both movies and television series.
Badges: Another characteristic of the profile is the display of badges. Badges are rewards that every user gets when using TV Time. They are divided in two main categories: discovery badges and addiction badges. Discovery badges are given when the user makes use of the site's features for the first time. Addiction badges, on the other hand, are given to the user when he or she interacts with TV shows.

Languages 
TV Time is currently available in fourteen languages: Arabic, Dutch, English, French, German, Italian, Japanese, Korean, Polish, Brazilian Portuguese, Portuguese, Russian, Spanish and Turkish. Users are able to filter their preferred languages in the app so they only see comments and reactions from the community in the languages they choose.

Reception 

Media outlets noted interest in TV Time'''s service as an analytics tool in the era of streaming, which makes it difficult to prove a television series' popularity and viewership since streaming services do not necessarily make that information public. In 2018, Variety cited the website's TVLytics data as one of the reasons for Netflix to sign a $100M deal with Warner Bros. Television to maintain the American sitcom Friends on its online library until 2019. The same year, United Talents Agency signed a deal with TV Time that granted them access to their data, in an effort to gain a deeper understanding into the content audiences were engaging with the most and how they were consuming it. According to TV Time CEO Richard Rosenblatt this would "[allow them to] recognize what shows are potentially going to be popular, what shows people will be binging, what moments really engaged the fans."

Some television personalities such as Álvaro Morte and Omar Sy have showed interest in TV Time's statistics on social media, the former reacting to his character on the Spanish television series Money Heist being featured in the Top 10 Most Voted Character of 2020 and the latter reacting to the French television series Lupin being number 1 on the Most Binged TV Series list on the week of its release."Omar Sy on Twitter: @netflix" Retrieved on June 17, 2021.

 Awards 

In 2021, TV Time won "Best Entertainment App" at The Webby Awards in the "People's Voice" category.

 Statistics 

 Most followed television series 

As of March 9, 2023, the most followed television shows on TV Time are:

 Most followed films 

As of June 18, 2021, the most followed films on TV Time were:

 Binge Reports TV Time offers weekly reports of the "most binged" TV series on their platform which are made public on the app's social medias. For the series to be considered as "binged" by a user, 4 episodes of it must have been watched in a row in the same day. The website calls this a "binge session." Since 2018, TV Time publishes the top 10 most binged series during the year. In 2019, Lucifer was reported to be the number 1 series for the longest in the report's history, with 8 consecutive weeks.

The following chart shows the "most binged" series of every year as reported by TV Time.

 Streaming Originals 

On September 21, 2021, TV Time announced its new Streaming Originals report. Similar to The Binge Report, the Streaming Originals report shows a list of the most tracked series every week, but only the ones whose provider is a streaming service.

 Database TV Time uses TheTVDB's database as a source of information for all shows and movies in its library. Initially an independent website, The TVDB was acquired by TV Time'' in 2019. Users can edit information about TV series such as characters, airing dates, networks and more on this database if they have a registered account.

User privacy 

The app developer provides information on the data that may be collected by the TV Time app and/or shared with third parties on the app listings in the Google Play Store and Apple App Store.

On the Google Play Store, it is declared that the TV Time app may collect and/or share approximate location data, email addresses, user identifiers, app interactions, diagnostics data, and device identifiers.

The Apple App Store listing of the app states that it may collect and/or share contact info, diagnostics, usage data, identifiers, and user content.

See also 

 Tvtag, a similar website also dedicated to television, now shut down.

References

Further reading
 
 
 

Television websites
Android (operating system) software
Internet properties established in 2011
IOS software
Social cataloging applications
Recommender systems
French entertainment websites